Wu-Chronicles Chapter II is a compilation album by American hip hop group Wu-Tang Clan and their affiliates. It was released on July 3, 2001 via Wu-Tang/Priority Records and includes several previously released tracks performed, produced or featured by Wu-Tang artists, serving as a sequel to 1999's Wu-Chronicles.

Track listing

Sample credits
Track 4 contains portions of "Winding River" written by Robert James

Charts

References

External links

Sequel albums
Wu-Tang Clan albums
Albums produced by RZA
2001 compilation albums
Hip hop compilation albums
Albums produced by DJ Premier
Albums produced by True Master
Albums produced by 4th Disciple